Psychedelic Navigator is an album by Acid Mothers Guru Guru, released in 2007 by Important Records. The band consists of members of the Japanese psychedelic band Acid Mothers Temple, Kawabata Makoto and Atsushi Tsuyama and German Krautrock drummer Mani Neumeier of Guru Guru.

Track listing

Personnel 

 Makoto Kawabata - Guitar, Vocals
 Mani Neumeier - Drums, Vocals, Editing
 Atsushi Tsuyama - Bass, Flute, Bass Guitar, Vocals

References

2007 albums
Acid Mothers Temple albums
Important Records albums